Northumberland was a federal and provincial electoral district in Ontario, Canada, that was represented in the House of Commons of Canada from 1917 to 1968 and from 1987 to 2003, ad in the Legislative Assembly of Ontario from 1999 to 2007.

This riding was first created in 1914 from Northumberland East and Northumberland West ridings. It initially consisted of the county of Northumberland, excluding the township of Monaghan South. In 1947, South Monghan was added to the riding, so that it consisted of the county of Northumberland. It was abolished in 1966 when it was redistributed between Northumberland—Durham and Prince Edward—Hastings ridings.

In 1976, Northumberland riding was recreated from parts of those two ridings. The new riding consisted of the County of Northumberland (including the Village of Hastings), but excluding the Township of Hope, the Town of Cobourg, and the part of the Township of Hamilton lying west of the Town of Cobourg and south of the Macdonald Cartier Freeway), and the Townships of Rawdon and Sidney (but excluding the city of Belleville) in the County of Hastings. In 1987, it was redefined to consist of the County of Northumberland and the City of Trenton.

The electoral district was abolished in 2003 when it was merged into Northumberland—Quinte West riding.

Members of Parliament

This riding has elected the following Members of Parliament:

Election results

See also

 Historical federal electoral districts of Canada
 List of Canadian federal electoral districts

External links
 Website of the Parliament of Canada

Former federal electoral districts of Ontario